The Alytus Arena is a universal indoor arena in Alytus, Lithuania. It was opened in 1977. Its reconstruction began in 2009 and was completed by the end of 2010. The arena was officially opened on 12 February 2011. The arena hosted the Group C games of EuroBasket 2011 from 31 August 2011 to 5 September 2011.

League attendances
This is a list of league games attendances of BC Dzūkija at Alytus Arena.

See also
 List of indoor arenas in Lithuania

References

External links

Sports venues completed in 1981
Alytus
Buildings and structures in Alytus County
Indoor arenas in Lithuania
Basketball venues in Lithuania